Sugnu (also spelt as Sugnoo) is a town in Kakching district in the Indian state of Manipur.

Geography 
It has an average altitude of 764 metres (2509 feet). The town is about 74 km from the capital of Manipur, Imphal. The Imphal River passes through Sugnu.

Transportation 
Sugnu is well connected with the capital of Manipur through the Imphal-Sugnu  State Highway through Thoubal, Kakching (2 hour by car and through Mayai Lambi (1.30 hr.) It is only 30 minute from Churachandpur.

Politics 
Sugnu is part of Outer Manipur (Lok Sabha constituency).

See also
 Chajing Khunou
 Wangoo
 Khongyam

References 

Cities and towns in Thoubal district
Thoubal